The 2013 NCAA Division I baseball season, play of college baseball in the United States organized by the National Collegiate Athletic Association (NCAA) at the Division I level, began on February 15, 2013.  The season progressed through the regular season, many conference tournaments and championship series, and concluded with the 2013 NCAA Division I baseball tournament and 2013 College World Series.  The College World Series, consisting of the eight remaining teams in the NCAA tournament and held annually in Omaha, Nebraska, at TD Ameritrade Park concluded on June 25, 2013 with the final game of the best of three championship series.  UCLA defeated Mississippi State two games to none to claim their first championship.

Realignment

 CSU Bakersfield, Dallas Baptist, Seattle, Texas–Arlington, Texas State, and UTSA joined the Western Athletic Conference, making that a ten-team baseball league.
 Fresno State and Nevada moved from the Western Athletic Conference to the Mountain West Conference.
 Missouri and Texas A&M moved from the Big 12 Conference to the Southeastern Conference, making that a fourteen team league.  Missouri joined the East Division, while the Aggies will play in the West.
 TCU and West Virginia moved to the Big 12 Conference from the Mountain West Conference and Big East Conference, respectively.

Conference formats
 The Big South Conference split into two six-team divisions prior to the season.

Season outlook

Conference standings
This is a partial list of conference standings for the 2013 season.

Conference winners and tournaments
Thirty one athletic conferences each end their regular seasons with a single-elimination tournament or a double-elimination tournament. The teams in each conference that win their regular season title are given the number one seed in each tournament. The winners of these tournaments receive automatic invitations to the 2013 NCAA Division I baseball tournament.  The West Coast Conference will launch a four team tournament for the first time in 2013.  The winner of the Great West Conference, which remains in a provisional status, does not receive an automatic bid.

College World Series

The 2013 season marked the sixty seventh NCAA Baseball Tournament, which culminated with the eight team College World Series.  The College World Series was held in Omaha, Nebraska.  The eight teams played a double-elimination format, with UCLA claiming their first championship with a two games to one series win over Mississippi State in the final.

Bracket

Award winners

Consensus All-American teams

Major player of the year awards
Dick Howser Trophy: Kris Bryant, San Diego
Baseball America: Kris Bryant, San Diego
Collegiate Baseball/Louisville Slugger:Kris Bryant, San Diego
American Baseball Coaches Association: Kris Bryant, San Diego
Golden Spikes Award: Kris Bryant, San Diego

Major freshman of the year awards
''Baseball America Freshman Of The Year:Collegiate Baseball Freshman Player of the Year:Collegiate Baseball Freshman Pitcher of the Year:Major coach of the year awardsAmerican Baseball Coaches Association:Baseball America'':
Collegiate Baseball Coach of the Year:
National Collegiate Baseball Writers Association (NCBWA) National Coach of the Year:
Chuck Tanner Collegiate Baseball Manager of the Year Award:
ABCA/Baseball America Assistant Coach of the Year:

Other major awards
Senior CLASS Award (baseball) (outstanding Senior of the Year in baseball): Carlos Lopez, Cal State Fullerton
Johnny Bench Award (Catcher of the Year): Stuart Turner, Ole Miss
Brooks Wallace Award (Shortstop of the Year): Alex Bregman, LSU
American Baseball Coaches Association Gold Glove:

See also

2013 NCAA Division I baseball rankings
2013 NCAA Division I baseball tournament

References